William Devin may refer to:
 William A. Devin (1871–1959), American jurist
 William F. Devin (1898–1982), American politician, mayor of Seattle 
 Bill Devin (1915–2000), American businessman, automotive entrepreneur and racing driver